Anne Daw is a South Australian advocate for the protection of water resources and prime agricultural land from mining and petroleum activities including exploration and production. Daw grew up on her father's grazing property near Kingston in the state's South East region, and began campaigning in 2007 when her neighbouring property came under threat because of a proposed lignite mine, near Kingston SE. 
She has been a member  of the Government of South Australia's Roundtable for Oil and Gas, previously known as the Round Table for the Roadmap for Unconventional Gas Projects in South Australia, since 2012.   
Daw has also held a seat at a Round Table for Health and Energy Policy in Canberra in 2013. 
Daw has continued to work at local, state, national and international levels, taken part in many public speaking engagements and forums, and has done extensive media in all forms. 
She was invited to be a speaker at the Murray Darling Association National Conference in Goolwa, SA in 2013.

In 2012, when she became a member of the Round Table for the Roadmap for Unconventional Gas Projects in South Australia, she learnt of the gas plans across the state and in the South East of South Australia.

Daw was a recipient of the Conservation Council of South Australia's Jill Hudson Award for Environment Protection in 2013.

References 

Australian environmentalists
Australian women environmentalists
Living people
Year of birth missing (living people)